Ballalaba is a locality in the Queanbeyan–Palerang Regional Council, New South Wales, Australia. It is located about 30 km southwest of Braidwood on the road to Cooma and on the Shoalhaven River. It had a "half-time" school from 1867 to 1870; from 1879 to 1940, it operated either as a "provisional" or a "half-time" school".

References

Localities in New South Wales
Queanbeyan–Palerang Regional Council
Southern Tablelands